An over-the-top media service is a streaming media service offered directly to viewers via the Internet. OTT bypasses cable, broadcast, and satellite television platforms, the companies that traditionally act as a controller or distributors of such content. Most of these services are owned by a major film studio. Some streaming services started as an add-on to Blu-ray offerings, which are supplements to the programs watched.

Streaming is an alternative to file downloading, a process in which the end-user obtains the entire file(s) for the content before watching or listening to it.

A client end-user can use the media player, computer, mobile phone, and smart TV to start playing digital video content before the entire file has been transmitted. Users will need an Internet connection to stream or download video content. Users lacking compatible hardware or software systems may be unable to stream or download certain content.

Streaming video on demand

Over 100 million subscribers

30–99 million subscribers

10–29 million subscribers

1–10 million subscribers

Fewer than 1 million subscribers

Free, Ad-Supported Television (FAST)

Streaming linear television
The following services are owned and operated by television networks, cable channels, or other conglomerates in that market. They are major content producers, and their streaming services serve as the primary means of distributing the content that often first airs on their networks or channels.

Streaming music/audio on demand

Internet radio

Livestreaming

Active services 
 17Live
 AcFun
 AfreecaTV
 Bigo Live
 Bilibili
 Caffeine (2018–)
 Dailymotion
 DouYu
 DLive (owned by BitTorrent) (2017–)
 Facebook Live (owned by Meta Platforms) (2015–)
 GoodGame (2008–)
 Huya
 Instagram (owned by Meta Platforms)
 KakaoTV
 Kuaishou
 Likee
 LINE LIVE
 LinkedIn Live
 Livestream
 NaverTV
 Niconico
 OK.ru
 OnlyFans
 Patreon
 Pixiv Sketch
 Rumble
 SHOWROOM
 Steam.tv
 TikTok/Douyin
 Triller
 Twitch (owned by Amazon) (2011–)
 Twitter
 VK
 V Live (owned by Naver Corporation) (2015–)
 Youku
 YouNow (2011–)
 YouTube (owned by Alphabet Inc.'s Google) (2005–)
 YuppTV

Former services 
 Azubu (2012–2017)
 CaveTube (2011–2016 or 2017)
 Colon (2018–2019)
 Cube TV (2018–2019)
 FAN LIVE (2016–2018)
 Fresh Live (2016–2020)
 Hitbox (owned by Azubu) (2013–2017)
 Houseparty (2016–2021)
 Huomao (2014–2021)
 Justin.tv (owned by Twitch Interactive/Justin.tv, Inc) (2007–2014)
 KingKong (2018–2020)
 Meerkat (2015–2016)
 Mixer (owned by Microsoft) (2016–2020)
 Panda.tv (2015–2019)
 Periscope (owned by Twitter) (2015–2021)
 Play2Live (2017–2019)
 Quanmin.tv (2015–2018)
 Rabb.it (2014–2019)
 Smashcast (2017–2020)
 Stream.me (2015–2019)
 StreamCraft (2018–2019)

See also 

 Streaming media
 Video on demand
 Over-the-top media service
 Direct-to-video
 Major film studios in the United States
 Comparison of video hosting services
 Livestreaming
 Livestreamed news
 National Streaming Day
 Television show
 List of content platforms by monthly active users

Notes

References 

 
Home video
Internet television streaming services